Badamak (also Romanized as Bādāmak; also known as Mazra‘eh-ye Bādāmak) is a village in Tang Chenar Rural District, in the Central District of Mehriz County, Yazd Province, Iran. At the 2006 census, its population was 8, in 5 families.

References 

Populated places in Mehriz County